Bluesiana Triangle is an album by Art Blakey, as well as the name of the short-lived American jazz, blues and funk group that recorded it, consisting of Blakey (drums), Dr. John (keyboards, guitar, vocals) and David "Fathead" Newman (saxophone, flute).

After Blakey's death, the group released a second album, featuring drummer Will Calhoun (who replaced Art Blakey), trombonist Ray Anderson, bassists Essiet Okon Essiet and Jay Leonhart (on different tracks), and percussionist Joe Bonadio.

Reception

Bob Porter of Allmusic states that "The music is an above-average mixture of jazz, blues, and funk".

Track listing 
 "Heads Up" (David "Fathead" Newman) - 5:43 
 "Life's a One Way Ticket" (Cousin Joe) - 5:31 
 "Shoo Fly, Don't Bother Me" (Thomas Brigham Bishop) - 10:06 
 "Need to Be Loved" (Art Blakey, David "Fathead" Newman, Mac Rebennack) - 3:42 
 "Next Time You See Me" (Bill Harvey, Earl Forest) - 4:49
 "When the Saints Go Marching In" (Traditional) - 6:16 
 "For All We Know" (J. Fred Coots, Sam M. Lewis) - 6:33

Personnel 
Art Blakey - drums, piano (track 7), vocals
Dr. John - guitar, organ, piano, vocals
David "Fathead" Newman - flute, saxophone, backing vocals 
Essiet Okon Essiet - bass, backing vocals
Joe Bonadio - drums (track 7), percussion

References 

Art Blakey albums
1990 albums
Windham Hill Records artists
Windham Hill Records albums